Anne Sewitsky (born 12 January 1978) is a Norwegian film director. Her 2010 film Happy, Happy was selected as the Norwegian entry for the Best Foreign Language Film at the 84th Academy Awards, but did not make the final shortlist. In 2015, her film Homesick was one of three films shortlisted by Norway to be their submission for the Academy Award for Best Foreign Language Film at the 88th Academy Awards, but it lost out to The Wave.

In 2019, she directed the Black Mirror episode "Rachel, Jack and Ashley Too"; and the episodes "Ties That Bind" and "The Laughing Place" from the TV series Castle Rock.

Filmography
Himmelblå (2008), four episodes
Happy, Happy (2010)
Totally True Love (2011)
Homesick (2015)
 2018 Anne Sewitsky film Sonja – The White Swan
"Rachel, Jack and Ashley Too" (2019), episode of the TV series Black Mirror
"Ties That Bind" (2019) and "The Laughing Place" (2019), episode of the TV series Castle Rock.
"Port Funchon, LA" (2020), episode of the TV series Monsterland.
 A Very British Scandal' (2021) BBC historical drama television miniseries

References

External links

Living people
1978 births
Norwegian film directors
Norwegian women film directors